The Solihull Barons are an English ice hockey team from the town of Solihull who play at Solihull Ice Rink on Hobs Moat Road. The current team, which is the third incarnation of the Barons, was formed in 2005; they are named after the original team of the same name who were formed in 1965, and played at the same ice rink between 1972 until 2000, after which they moved to Coventry and became the Coventry Blaze.

History

Previous incarnations
The Solihull Barons won the Southern League in 1977–78 and the English League in 1992–93. Canadian Rick Fera played for the original Solihull Barons in the 1987–88 season.

In 1996, the team rebranded themselves as the "Solihull Blaze", and in 2000 they moved from Solihull's Blue Ice Plaza to Coventry's SkyDome Arena, rebranding themselves again as the "Coventry Blaze". As this left Solihull without an ice hockey team for the first time since 1965, the Barons were reformed under a new franchise and returned to their original arena, which had benefited from a much-needed overhaul. Unfortunately, the £1.8m refurbishment was delayed by vandals, leaving the venue operators with a £75,000 damage repair bill, and the grand re-opening was postponed until mid-October 2000.

Despite the newly improved playing facility, the club struggled to survive in the English Premier Ice Hockey League and ultimately dissolved again just two years later in 2002. They were initially replaced by the Milton Keynes Kings, who moved to Solihull from their own hometown due to a dispute with the owners of their arena, and who re-branded themselves the "Solihull MK Kings" to demonstrate the fact that they were now representing both Solihull and Milton Keynes in ice hockey. Once again, however, the team quickly dissolved, playing just a single season of hockey in the British National League before folding. Following the closure of the Solihull MK Kings, a new "Solihull Kings" team was created and placed back in the EPIHL, but yet again this team folded, collapsing after two seasons in 2007.

Current team
The current Solihull Barons team was formed in 2005, and played their first two seasons in the EPIHL. At the end of the 2006–07 season they were relegated to the English National Ice Hockey League (ENIHL). The Barons currently compete in Northern Division One, known as the "Moralee Conference". The team hold charity games for Birmingham Children's Hospital.

Club roster 2022–23
(*) Denotes a Non-British Trained player (Import)

2021/22 Outgoing

Honours
English National Ice Hockey League North Division 2 champions: 2010-2011
English National Ice Hockey League Laidler Division champions: 2013-2014
English National Ice Hockey League Laidler Division champions: 2014-2015
English National Ice Hockey League Laidler Play-Off champions: 2014-2015
English National Ice Hockey League Midland Cup: 2019-2020

References

Ice hockey teams in England
Sport in the West Midlands (county)